Irchester Old Lodge Pit is a  geological Site of Special Scientific Interest south of Wellingborough in Northamptonshire. It is a Geological Conservation Review site.

This is described by Natural England as "a key Middle Jurassic locality important for the information it yields on both Bathonian environments and stratigraphy". It exposes White Limestone which has many fossils, especially molluscs.

The site is private land with no public access.

References

Sites of Special Scientific Interest in Northamptonshire
Geological Conservation Review sites